Jacques Forest (14 June 1920 – 16 February 2012) was a French carcinologist.

Biography

Born in Créteil on 14 June 1920, Jacques Forest grew up in Maubeuge. He served in the army for a year during the Second World War, and went on to study at the University of Lille after demobilisation.

In association with Jean-Louis Fage, Forest began working on hermit crabs, and rapidly became an expert; he described over 70 new species in the family Diogenidae, for example. He also published on other Decapoda, including crabs and, most significantly, Neoglyphea inopinata, a living species of a group previously considered long-since extinct.

Forest was also an enthusiastic field biologist, and took part in several oceanographic expeditions. He launched the MUSORSTOM expeditions in 1976. He was also involved with the scientific journals Bulletin du Muséum national d'Histoire naturelle and Crustaceana.

Forest retired on 1 October 1989, at the age of 69, and continued to be involved with the journal Crustaceana until 2003. The Crustacean Society awarded Forest their Excellence in Research Award in 2008. He died on 16 February 2012.

Legacy
Taxa named in honour of Jacques Forest include:
Genera
Forestia Guinot, 1976
Pagurojacquesia de Saint Laurent & McLaughlin, 2000 (replacement name for Jacquesia de Saint Laurent & McLaughlin, 1999)
Jacforus Ng & Clark, 2003

Species

Lumbricalus adriatica foresti (Fauvel & Rullier, 1959)
Sicyonia foresti Rossignol, 1962
Thalamita foresti Crosnier, 1962
Lembos foresti Mateus & Mateus, 1966
Nematopsis foresti (Theodorides, 1967)
Ventricolaria foresti Fischer-Piette & Testud, 1967
Asymmetrione foresti (Bourdon, 1968)
Brachynotus foresti Zariquiey-Alvarez, 1968
Megachelione foresti Bourdon, 1968
Brazilserolis foresti (Bastida & Torti, 1970)
Cyathidium foresti Cherbonnier & Guille, 1972
Haploniscus foresti Chardy, 1974
Podocallichirus foresti (Le Loeuff & Intès, 1974)
Paramunna foresti Carvacho, 1977
Eucheilota foresti Goy, 1979
Idmidronea foresti Buge, 1979
Caryophyllia foresti Zibrowius, 1980
Strengeriana foresti Rodriguez, 1980
Alpheus foresti Banner & Banner, 1981
Holothuria foresti Cherbonnier & Feral, 1981
Leptochiton foresti (Leloup, 1981)
Paralophogaster foresti Bacescu, 1981
Periclimenes foresti A. J. Bruce, 1981
Psilopsea foresti d'Hondt, 1981
Nuculana foresti Metivier, 1982
Platypodia foresti Serene, 1984
Ethusa foresti Chen, 1985
Eurysquilla foresti Moosa, 1985
Processa foresti Noel, 1985
Jolivetya foresti Cals, 1986
Niso foresti Bouchet & Warén, 1986
Arcoscalpellum foresti Rosell, 1989
Forcepia foresti Lévi & Lévi, 1989
Leucosia foresti Chen, 1989
Lophopagurus foresti Zarenkov, 1989
Porcellanopagurus foresti Zarenkov, 1989
Trachycarcinus foresti Guinot, 1989
Upogebia foresti Nguyen, 1989
Alainosquilla foresti Moosa, 1991
Ascorhynchus foresti Stock, 1991
Lophopagurus foresti McLaughlin & Gunn, 1992
Dromia foresti McLay, 1993
Palaemonella foresti A. J. Bruce, 2001

References

1920 births
2012 deaths
French carcinologists
People from Créteil
National Museum of Natural History (France) people